UFC 10: The Tournament was a mixed martial arts event held by the Ultimate Fighting Championship (UFC) on July 12, 1996, at the Fairgrounds Arena in Birmingham, Alabama. The event was seen live on pay per view in the United States, and later released on home video. A fictional UFC 10, staged at the Grand Olympic Auditorium, is featured during one scene in the film Virtuosity, including an appearance from fighter Ken Shamrock.

History
UFC 10 marked the UFC's return to the tournament format (which was removed in favor of single bouts at UFC 9). The card featured an eight man tournament, as well as two alternate bouts in case of an injury, and to fill time for the pay-per-view broadcast.  

UFC was originally supposed to air this event from the Providence Civic Center in Providence, Rhode Island.

UFC 10 featured the first appearance of Mark Coleman, who beat fan favorite Don Frye to win the tournament. It was also the first time that Bruce Buffer announced the fights inside the Octagon, replacing Rich Goins. (Bruce's brother Michael Buffer had announced at UFC 6 and UFC 7.) However, Rich Goins came back for UFC 8 and UFC 11.

Results

UFC 10 bracket

See also 
 Ultimate Fighting Championship
 List of UFC champions
 List of UFC events
 1996 in UFC

References

External links
UFC 10 results at Sherdog.com
UFC 10 fights reviews
Official UFC website

Ultimate Fighting Championship events
1996 in mixed martial arts
Mixed martial arts in Alabama
Sports in Birmingham, Alabama
1996 in Alabama